Ojaq Kandi (also Romanized as Ojāq Kandī) is a village in Nazarkahrizi Rural District, Nazarkahrizi District, Hashtrud County, East Azerbaijan Province, Iran. At the 2006 census, its population was 91, in 22 families.

References 

Towns and villages in Hashtrud County